The 2013 season was Persija's 82nd competitive season. Persija finished in 11th place.

Season overview
The team started the season with Iwan Setiawan as coach, but in the middle he was replaced by Benny Dollo. Persija now in 15th position Indonesia Super League standings. Fabiano be the captain of the team after Bambang Pamungkas not with Persija in this season. Had been in the bottom of the standings, now Persija up away from the relegation zone.

Club

Coaching Staff

Kit
Supplier: League

Persija third jersey this season is a repro from Persija home jersey in 1985. At the time Persija still use red as the color of the home jersey. But since 1997, the home jersey Persija changed to orange color.

Squad

Out on loan

Transfers

In

Out

Matches

Indonesia Super League

References

See also
 2013 Indonesia Super League

Persija Jakarta seasons
Indonesian football clubs 2013 season